The Mini-Blue Ribbon Pairs North American bridge championship is held at the Fall American Contract Bridge League (ACBL) North American Bridge Championship (NABC).

The Mini-Blue Ribbon Pairs is a six-session matchpoint pairs event with two qualifying sessions and two final sessions.
The event typically starts on the first Tuesday of the Fall NABC.
The event is restricted to players with fewer than 6,000 masterpoints who have earned a Blue Ribbon qualification.

History
The inaugural Mini-Blue Ribbon Pairs was held in 2005 at the Fall NABC in Denver. There is a pre-qualification requirement: players must have earned a Blue Ribbon qualification to participate. This is done by placing first or second in certain competitions.

Winners

Sources

"ACBL Live" acbl.org. ACBL. Retrieved 1 August 2019.

List of previous winners, Page 9

2008 winners, Page 1

External links
ACBL official website

North American Bridge Championships